Prostaglandin E synthase (or PGE synthase) is an enzyme involved in eicosanoid and glutathione metabolism, a member of MAPEG family. It generates prostaglandin E (PGE) from prostaglandin H2.

The synthase generating PGE2 is a membrane-associated protein.

Isozymes 

Humans express three prostaglandin-E synthase isozymes, each encoded by a separate gene:

References

External links
 
 

EC 5.3.99